"This Is My City" is a song by Australian band Skyhooks, released in July 1976 as the second single from the band's third studio album, Straight in a Gay Gay World. The song peaked at number 32 in Australia.

Author Macainsh said, "There's a bit of a comment there... maybe not a heavy social comment... it's just about whatever city you're living in. You might hate it, but it's best to love it."

Track listing
7" single (K-6487)
 Side A "This Is My City" - 3:37
 Side B "Somewhere in Sydney" - 3:44

Charts

References 

1976 singles
Mushroom Records singles
1976 songs
Songs written by Greg Macainsh
Skyhooks (band) songs